Pukintika (Aymara puki white soil, tika adobe, Hispanicized spellings Puguintica, Puquintica, Poquentica, Puquentica) is a volcano   in the Andes, about 5,407 m (17,740 ft) high, situated  in the Cordillera Occidental on the border of Bolivia and Chile. It is located in the Arica and Parinacota Region of Chile and the Oruro Department of Bolivia (in Sabaya Province, Sabaya Municipality, Julo Canton). Pukintika lies to the north of the Salar de Surire, east beside Arintika volcano which is younger than Pukintika. Deposits of elemental sulfur have been found on Pukintika.

See also

 Asu Asuni
 Kimsa Chata
 List of mountains in the Andes
 Qillwiri
 Uyarani
 Wila Qullu

References 

Volcanoes of Arica y Parinacota Region
Mountains of Oruro Department
International mountains of South America
Bolivia–Chile border